Hugh Butler may refer to:
 Hugh Butler (footballer) (1875–1939), Scottish footballer
 Hugh A. Butler (1878–1954), Nebraska politician
 Hugh Ernest Butler (1916–1978), Welsh-born astronomer
 Hugh Butler (MP), British politician

See also 

 Hugh Butler Lake, the reservoir created by Red Willow Dam